William Bingham La Selle (October 1845 – July 30, 1924) was a member of the Wisconsin State Assembly.

Biography
La Selle was born in October 1845 in Swanton (town), Vermont. Sources have differed on the exact date. During the American Civil War, he served with the 30th Wisconsin Volunteer Infantry Regiment of the Union Army. In 1871, La Selle married Lanah B. Chafee. They had three children.

Political career
La Selle was elected to the Assembly in 1886 and 1888. Other positions he held include Town Clerk of Plainfield (town), Wisconsin from 1877 to 1881. He was a Republican.

References

External links

People from Swanton (town), Vermont
People from Plainfield, Wisconsin
Republican Party members of the Wisconsin State Assembly
City and town clerks
People of Wisconsin in the American Civil War
Union Army soldiers
1845 births
1924 deaths